In physics, a Cauchy horizon is a light-like boundary of the domain of validity of a Cauchy problem (a particular boundary value problem of the theory of partial differential equations).  One side of the horizon contains closed space-like geodesics and the other side contains closed time-like geodesics. The concept is named after Augustin-Louis Cauchy.

Under the averaged weak energy condition (AWEC), Cauchy horizons are inherently unstable. However, cases of AWEC violation, such as the Casimir effect caused by periodic boundary conditions, do exist, and since the region of spacetime inside the Cauchy horizon has closed timelike curves it is subject to periodic boundary conditions.  If the spacetime inside the Cauchy horizon violates AWEC, then the horizon becomes stable and frequency boosting effects would be canceled out by the tendency of the spacetime to act as a divergent lens. Were this conjecture to be shown empirically true, it would provide a counter-example to the strong cosmic censorship conjecture.

In 2018, it was shown that the spacetime behind the Cauchy horizon of a charged, rotating black hole exists, but is not smooth, so the strong cosmic censorship conjecture is false.

The simplest example is the internal horizon of a Reissner–Nordström black hole.

In popular media 
In the 2020 film Palm Springs, the character Sarah mentions the Cauchy horizon as she formulates a plan to escape a time loop.

In the pilot episode of 2021 Amazon original series Solos, the character Leah solves time travel with "the Cauchy horizon", which is central to the episode.

Related 
 Augustin-Louis Cauchy
 Event horizon

References

External links
 On Crossing the Cauchy Horizon

Theory of relativity